Raglan Road Crossing Halt was a station on the former Coleford, Monmouth, Usk and Pontypool Railway. It was opened in November 1930 on the approximate site of a previous stop, Raglan Road, which had been open since the opening of the line in October 1857 and was closed in 1876 along with Raglan Footpath and replaced by Raglan station. It was intended to serve the village of Raglan, Monmouthshire. The halt was closed in 1955 along with the rest of the line due to an engine drivers strike. The station was situated 7 miles and 59 chains from Monmouth Troy and about 1 mile from the new Raglan station. The halt got its name from the nearby level crossing and crossing keeper's cottage on the down side of the line just north of the halt. The halt was of earth and cinder construction, typical of the Great Western Railway.

References

Disused railway stations in Monmouthshire
Former Great Western Railway stations
Railway stations in Great Britain opened in 1857
Railway stations in Great Britain closed in 1876
Railway stations in Great Britain opened in 1930
Railway stations in Great Britain closed in 1955
1857 establishments in Wales